Poéssé is a town in the Soaw Department of Boulkiemdé Province in central western Burkina Faso. It has a population of 3,591.

References

Populated places in Boulkiemdé Province